"Here Comes the Night" is a song by the American rock band the Beach Boys from their 1967 album Wild Honey. Written by Brian Wilson and Mike Love, the group later rerecorded the track for their 1979 album, L.A. (Light Album), as a disco song lasting nearly eleven minutes. A four-minute edit of this version was released as a single on February 19, 1979 and reached number 44 on the U.S. Billboard Hot 100.

Composition
Author Andrew Hickey noted: "This is a rather by-the-numbers song which however manages the interesting trick of having the chorus apparently lose its tonal centre altogether – normally one would have a harmonically simple chorus while the verses are complex, but this has simple verses in C but a chorus whose chords are Cmin, Ab7 and F, which are chords that just should not go together."

Original recording
"Here Comes the Night" was recorded at Beach Boys Studio on October 26, 1967.

Disco remake

The 1979 disco version of the song, produced by Bruce Johnston and Curt Becher, is over eight minutes longer than the original song, with Becher contributing to the arrangement.

Dennis Wilson was opposed to this recording, and Brian did not participate. Al Jardine later expressed his distaste for the disco remake of the song.

There are five edits of this disco version. The first edit appears on the L.A. (Light Album), while the second edit was released on a 12" single release (Caribou/Brother/CBS 2Z8-9028). The third edit was the B-side of the 12" single, which is a slightly shorter instrumental (backing track) version of the song. The fourth and fifth version of the song is found on the 7" single release (Caribou/Brother/CBS ZS8 9026)(DJ version).

Variations
Time: 10 min 51 sec (album version)
Time: 10 min 36 sec (12" single edit)
Time: 9 min 4 sec (12" instrumental edit)
Time: 4 min 28 sec (7" single edit) long version
Time: 3 min 18 sec (7" single edit) short version

Reception
Record producer Tony Visconti spoke positively of the song, commenting, "I can play that 10 times today and I wouldn't get bored with it."

The "Here Comes the Night" disco single (backed with "Baby Blue") was issued on February 19, 1979 and peaked at number 44. The band briefly introduced the disco version into their live set in 1979. Jardine commented, "We performed it once and we were booed. We actually received such criticism that we never played it again."

Reviewing the single in 1979, Smash Hits said, "Hard, fast electro-burble and swirling strings pound along beneath snatches of harmonising voices and a lot of solo lead singing of an unremarkable song. It's OK but there are plenty of better disco tracks about." Record World said that the song "is lush and perfectly adapted to the genre."

Personnel
Per Craig Slowinski.

1967 version

The Beach Boys
Brian Wilson – lead vocals, piano
Carl Wilson – guitar
Dennis Wilson – drums

Additional musician
Ron Brown – bass

1979 version
The Beach Boys
Carl Wilson – lead vocals
Mike Love – backing vocals
Al Jardine – backing vocals
Bruce Johnston – backing vocals
Additional personnel

Murray Adler - violin
Mike Baird - drums, percussion
Myer Bello - viola
Curt Boettcher - guitars
Joe Chemay – bass guitar
Marcia Van Dyke - violin
Jesse Ehrlich - cello
Gene Estes - Clavinet, vibraphone
Bob Esty - synthesizer, percussion
Victor Feldman - percussion
Henry Ferber - violin
Ronald Folsom - violin
James Getzoff - violin
Allan Harshman - viola
Raymond Kelley - cello
William Kurasch - violin
Marvin Limonick - violin
Joy Lyle - violin
Mike Meros - Clavinet, Wurlitzer electric piano
David Montagu - violin
Ira Newborn - guitars
Michael Nowak - viola
Judy Perett - cello
Joel Peskin – alto saxophone
Nathan Ross - violin
David Schwartz - viola
Sid Sharp - violin
Harry Shlutz - cello
Linn Subotnick - viola
Wah Wah Watson - lead guitar
Herschel Wise - viola
Dan Wyman – synthesizer programming
Tibor Zelig - violin
Richie Zito - lead guitar

Charts

References

External links
 
 

1967 songs
1979 singles
The Beach Boys songs
Blue-eyed soul songs
Songs written by Brian Wilson
Songs written by Mike Love
Song recordings produced by Bruce Johnston